Percus is a genus of beetles in the family Carabidae, containing the following species:

 Percus bilineatus Dejean, 1828
 Percus corrugatus Billberg, 1815
 Percus corsicus Audinet-Serville, 1821
 Percus cylindricus Chaudoir, 1868
 Percus dejeanii Dejean, 1831
 Percus espagnoli Lagar Mascaro, 1965
 Percus grandicollis Audinet-Serville, 1821
 Percus guiraoi Perez Arcas, 1869
 Percus lineatus (Solier, 1835)
 Percus passerinii Dejean, 1828
 Percus patruelis L. Dofour, 1820
 Percus paykulli (P. Rossi, 1792)
 Percus plicatus Dejean, 1828
 Percus politus Dejean, 1831
 Percus reichei Kraatz, 1858
 Percus strictus Dejean, 1828
 Percus stultus L. Dufour, 1820
 Percus villae Kraatz, 1858

References

Pterostichinae